USS Egret (AMS-46/YMS-136) was a  acquired by the U.S. Navy for the task of removing mines that had been placed in the water to prevent ships from passing.

YMS-136 was built at the Astoria Marine Construction Company, Astoria, Oregon; she was laid down on 16 July 1942, launched 8 February 1943, and commissioned on 19 March 1943.

YMS-136 was reclassified as coastal minesweeper USS Egret (AMS-46) on 19 August 1947.

On 7 February 1955 she was designated MSCO-46.

Egret was struck from the Navy list on 1 November 1959 and transferred to the Brazilian Navy as Jutai on 15 August 1960.
Awards:
American campaign
World War 2 victory
Navy Occupation with Asia clasp
Asiatic campaign with 3 stars
American Area Codes (A) / Asiatic-Pacific Area Codes (P) / European African Middle Eastern Area Codes (E)

List of engagement stars for World War II:
21 Jul 44 - 15 Aug 44  P29-7; 6 Sep 44 - 14 Oct 44 P30-2
22 Sep 45 - 30 Oct 45 P207-7 ; 4 Dec 45 - 12 Feb 46 P207-9***
Minesweeping Operations Pacific P-207 - P-207-28

(Only 1 star for participation in 1 or more of the following:)***

(information obtained from Navy and Marine Corps Award Manual 1953)

References

External links 
 

YMS-1-class minesweepers of the United States Navy
Ships built in Astoria, Oregon
1943 ships
World War II minesweepers of the United States
Javari-class minesweepers